Chromera velia, also known as a "chromerid", is a unicellular photosynthetic organism in the superphylum Alveolata. It is of interest in the study of apicomplexan parasites, specifically their evolution and accordingly, their unique vulnerabilities to drugs.

The discovery of C. velia has sparked renewed interest in protist research, concerning both algae and parasites, as well as free-living unicells. Strict separation of botanical protists (algae) and zoological protists (protozoa) has been conventional but C. velia may be regarded as a good example of a bridge linking both categories.

C. velia has typical features of alveolates, being phylogenetically related to Apicomplexa (a subgroup of alveolates), and contains a photosynthetic plastid (chloroplast) while the apicomplexans have a non-photosynthetic plastid called the apicoplast. C. velia is also related to another subgroup of alveolates, the dinoflagellates of which most are photosynthetic.

C. velia uses metabolites (reduced carbon) from its plastid as its primary energy source. The same is true of the algal cousin of C. velia, another chromerid Vitrella brassicaformis. Together these are phylogenetically the closest known autotrophic organisms to apicomplexans.

Parasites in the apicomplexan genus Plasmodium are the causative agents of malaria. Studies of C. velia and V. brassicaformis are broadly useful for understanding the biochemistry, physiology and evolution of the malaria parasite, other apicomplexan parasites, and dinoflagellates.

Plastid terminology 
"Apicoplast" is a specialised word, derived from the word "plastid". Initially the word plastid was more suitable than "chloroplast" when describing organelles of apparent algal descent in any protist, but that lack any chlorophyll or light absorbing pigment. Those found in apicomplexan parasites are a prominent example. The majority of members of the apicomplexan lineage still contain a genome in the plastid, indicating the organelle of the lineage's ancestors was once photosynthetic, but these plastids have no light absorbing pigments or light reaction machinery.

While Chromera velia contains a photosynthetic plastid, the majority of apicomplexan relatives contain a non-photosynthetic plastid, and the remainder contain no plastid. The ancestral photosynthetic plastid of ancestral apicomplexans may have been very similar to the plastid of C. velia or the plastid of V. brassicaformis.

Just as the term "plastid" has become widely adopted for chloroplast-derived organelles of non-photosynthetic protists, the term "apicoplast" has also gained acceptance for the plastid of apicomplexans. In current usage, the term plastid may even be used to describe the chloroplast of any photosynthetic organism, and so has a general non-discriminatory use.

Isolation and phylogeny of C. velia 
Chromera velia was first isolated by Dr Bob Moore (then at Carter Lab, University of Sydney) from the stony coral (Scleractinia, Cnidaria) Plesiastrea versipora (Faviidae) of Sydney Harbour, New South Wales, Australia (collectors Thomas Starke-Peterkovic and Les Edwards, December 2001).

It was also cultured by Moore from the stony coral Leptastrea purpurea (Faviidae) of One Tree Island Great Barrier Reef, Queensland, Australia (collectors Karen Miller and Craig Mundy, November 2001).

With the use of DNA sequencing, a relationship between C. velia, dinoflagellates and apicomplexans was noted. Genomic DNA of C. velia was extracted to provide PCR templates, and when the sequences of the amplified genes were compared with those of other species, biostatistical methods resulted in placement of C. velia on a phylogenetic branch close to the apicomplexans. Through a variety of phylogenetic tests on the orthologous genes found in similar organisms, researchers were able to relate C. velia to dinoflagellates and apicomplexans which are alveolates. Both the nucleus and the plastid of C. velia showed alveolate ancestry. A subsequent study of the C.velia and V. brassicaformis plastid genomes has shown in greater detail that the plastids of peridinin dinoflagellates, apicomplexans and chromerids share the same lineage, derived from a red-algal-type plastid.

Description and availability
After the naming of the organism and description of the immotile form, several papers have since documented the vegetative motile form which excysts in a set of eight siblings from the progenitor cell.

A structure resembling an apical complex in the flagellate, includes a conoid or pseudoconoid and long sacculate micronemes, confirming a relationship to apicomplexans. However, this relationship has yet to be formalised, beyond the fact that chromerids and apicomplexans are classified as sister groups within the Alveolata. The precise function of the apical organelles of the Chromerida, is unknown though the organelles have been studied in some detail.

Live C. velia is available to purchase from the NCMA culture collection in Maine USA, and is backed up in other culture collections such as CCAP (UK), and SCCAP (Scandinavia).

Preserved material is deposited in the Australian Museum, Sydney, as holotype/hapantotype Z.6967, being a preserved culture embedded in PolyBed 812, and is separately deposited also in absolute ethanol.

Special features of the C. velia plastid
The plastid of Chromera velia has 4 surrounding membranes and contains chlorophyll a, while chlorophyll c is missing. Photosynthesis has been examined in C. velia, and its photosynthetic carbon assimilation was shown to be very efficient, in the sense of adaptability to a wide range of light regimes, from high light to low light. Thus like other algae that contain only chlorophyll a (such as Nannochloropsis, a stramenopile), the lack of chlorophyll c does not appear to debilitate chromerids in any way. Accessory pigments in C. velia include isofucoxanthin.

Unlike other eukaryotic algae which use only UGG codons to encode the amino acid tryptophan in plastid genomes, the plastid genome of C. velia contains the codon UGA at several positions that encode tryptophan in the  gene and other genes. The UGA-Trp codon is characteristic of apicoplasts, and the mitochondria of various organisms, but until the discovery of C. velia, was unprecedented in any photosynthetic plastid. Similarly a bias towards poly-U tails is found specifically on the subset of apicoplast-encoded genes that are involved in photosynthesis in C. velia. Discovery of these two genetic features, the UGA-Trp, and the poly-U tailed photosynthesis genes, indicates that C. velia  provides an appropriate model to study the evolution of the apicoplast. Another characteristic feature of C. velia is that its plastid genome is linear-mapping. Janouškovec et al 2013 also presents the expression pathway DNA  RNA  photosystem I protein A1. It is unusually late to fully resolve: It is not fully assembled as a single transcript or even as a single translation product, but only after that step.

Mitochondrion
The mitochondrial genome of C. velia encodes a single gene - cox1 - and several fragmented rRNA molecules. This mitochondrial genome is one step further devolved than those of peridinin dinoflagellates, which contain three protein-coding genes. However both lineages, C. velia and dinoflagellates, contain functioning mitochondria, the genes having moved to the nucleus.

Most of the Apicomplexan mitochondria that have been previously sequenced also have only three protein encoding genes including cox1 and a number of fragmented rRNA genes. Exceptions to this rule are known: the apicomplexan organism Cryptosporidium appears to lack a mitochondrion entirely.

The C. velia mitochondrial apparatus differs significantly from that of the other chromerid Vitrella brassicaformis. A recent finding is that the respiratory complexes I and III of C. velia are missing, and that the function of complex III has been taken over by a lactate->cytochrome C oxidoreductase  By contrast the more ancestral chromerid mitochondrial genome, represented by that of V. brassicaformis retains a canonical complex III.

An unexpected finding in Chromera was a large (1 μm diameter) ever-present organelle bounded by two membranes, originally thought to be the mitochondrion. This organelle may not be a mitochondrion, but an extrusosome called the "chromerosome". The actual mitochondria, by contrast, were found to be small and multiple, just as for other alveolates.

Evolution 
The discovery of Chromera velia and its unique plastid which is similar in origin to the apicoplasts, provides an important link in the evolutionary history of the apicomplexans. Previous to the description of C. velia, much speculation surrounded the idea of a photosynthetic ancestral lineage for apicomplexan parasites. For a step by step history of the characterization of the apicomplexan apicoplast organelle, see for example the web review by Vargas Parada (2010).

It is hypothesized that apicomplexans, with their relic chloroplast, the apicoplast, were once able to synthesize energy via photosynthesis. Ancient apicomplexans or their immediate progenitors may have had a symbiotic relationship with the coral reef around them. To achieve that, these ancient organisms would have possessed a working chloroplast. However, if so, this autotrophic ability was lost and apicomplexans have slowly evolved to become parasitic species dependent on their hosts for survival.

Although researchers are still discussing why apicomplexans would sacrifice their photosynthetic ability and become parasitic, it is suggested that clues might be gathered by studying aspects of the evolution of the Chromerida, such as the development of an apical complex of organelles that were used by later descendants to invade host cells. In July 2015 the full genome sequences of chromerids C.velia and V. brassicaformis were published, revealing the array of genes that were co-opted or adapted in the transition from a free living lifestyle to a parasitic lifestyle.

The plastid genome of C. velia is unusual in that there is evidence it may be linear  and contains split genes for key photosystem genes. The linear state of the C. velia plastid genome is a reminder that C. velia is not an ancestral organism, but is a derived form, which evolved from an ancestral photosynthetic alveolate that presumably had a circular plastid genome, just as the other known chromerid Vitrella brassicaformis does.

Much research surrounds the flagellar apparatus of Chromera, Vitrella and apicomplexans, in relation to the morphological transition of this organelle during the origination of parasitism in apicomplexans. It does appear that C. velia exist as a free-living phototroph when necessary or when environmental conditions are suitable, but can also infect coral larvae and live as an intracellular parasite.

Pharmacological significance 
One potentially important contribution of research on C. velia, besides its position as a missing link between parasitic and algal species, is its potential in studies aimed at finding new antimalarial drugs or clarifying the function of existing antimalarial drugs . Many drugs that have been in clinical use for a long time affect functions in the apicoplast in Plasmodium cells. The essential biological function of the apicoplast is solely the production of isoprenoids and their derivatives, without which the parasites cannot live.

C. velia could serve as a convenient model target for the development of antimalarial drugs, since it effectively contains the original apicoplast, as it were, and since its nuclear genome closely resembles that of the ancestral proto-parasites. In the laboratory setting, working with apicomplexan parasites can be difficult, hazardous and expensive, because they must be infected into live host cells (in tissue culture) to remain viable. Chromera velia, is more easily maintained than apicomplexan parasites, yet is related to them, so may potentially provide a laboratory model for the understanding or development of antimalarial treatments. C. velia is able to live independently of its normal animal hosts and can be grown easily and cheaply in a laboratory setting.

Just as humans are subject to infections by the apicomplexans Plasmodium and Cryptosporidium, animals are also subject to infection by apicomplexans including Toxoplasma, Babesia, Neospora, and Eimeria. It is said anecdotally, that almost every animal on earth has one or more species of apicomplexan parasite that challenge it. The economic burden from apicomplexan parasites is estimated in the billions of dollars, (see also Malaria) on top of the human and animal costs of these organisms. An increased understanding of the evolutionary roles and functions of apicoplasts and apical complexes can impact on research about the apicomplexan parasites of livestock animals, making C. velia of interest in an agricultural context as well as in the medical and ecological fields.

A provisional patent on the use of Chromerida (Chromera and Vitrella) as subjects for screening and testing of anti-apicomplexan drugs was not lodged as a full patent, which leaves the way open for use of these organisms in commercial development of screening methods for useful compounds.

Ecology
One study has shown that Chromera may have a symbiotic role within corals, being vertically transmitted from parent to offspring Montipora digitata via the coral's egg stage.  The Chromera cells could be cultured from the M.digitata eggs and were subsequently used to transiently colonise Acropora coral larvae. Chromera'''s known host range therefore includes the corals M. digitata, P. versipora (type host) and L. purpurea (alternate host), and extends through tropical and temperate waters. The symbiont may obtain metabolites from the host, and it has been proposed this may potentially increase its growth rate inside the host.

Analysis of environmental metagenomic datasets has revealed that there are other species related to C. velia and V. brassicaformis associated with corals, but yet to be described. These associations are globally distributed. Among these is the uncultured undescribed "apicomplexan-related lineage-V" which was inferred by the authors to be potentially photosynthetic, and appears to be a symbiosis specialist. Cultured chromerids by comparison can be hypothesized to move between the free-living and coral-associated states, as they are found in M. digitata eggs but are also associated with seaweed, judging from correlations in macroalgal metagenomic datasets. The range of life strategies and niches adopted by apicomplexan-related algae therefore resembles the spectrum of niches occupied by the coral symbiont Symbiodinium.

 Research Community 
The first Chromera conference and workshop was held at the Heron Island Research Station, Queensland, Australia from November 21–25, 2011. Highlights included diving and culturing. Presentations included the announcement of a formal description of the second isolated chromerid, Vitrella brassicaformis''. Professors and students alike participated in the conference and workshop, and a broad range of topics was covered. It was agreed that further meetings would follow. The second conference was held in South Bohemia, Czech Republic, from June 22–25, 2014, arranged by the Oborník lab, via open email list.

References

Species described in 2008
Chromerida